Pseudonebularia dovpeledi is a species of sea snail, a marine gastropod mollusk in the family Mitridae, the miters or miter snails.

Description
Pseudonebularia dovpeledi has the following physical characteristics: it is a sea snail.  The shell has  a well-developed siphonal canal. The siphon is an elongated and trunk like extensible tube formed from a fold in the mantle, and is used to suck water into the mantle cavity. There is a bipectinate osphradium located at base of siphon and branches off from a central axis. There is an olfactory organ located at the base of the siphon. There is a heart with a single auricle, a single pair a gill leaflets on one side of the central axis and 1 kidney.

Distribution

References

Mitridae
Gastropods described in 1997